The Rousseau Gambit (or Ponziani Countergambit after Domenico Lorenzo Ponziani) is a chess opening that begins with the moves:

1. e4 e5
2. Nf3 Nc6
3. Bc4 f5

The gambit is named after French chess master Eugène Rousseau. White can decline the gambit by supporting the e-pawn with 4.d3. The resulting position is similar to a King's Gambit Declined with colours reversed, and White's  aiming at Black's weakened . Black will have trouble castling kingside, and Ng5 is a likely threat. White's position is better, but still requires careful play.

Key themes for White are to attack Black's kingside and to avoid attempts by Black to  the position. Exchanges involving White's  are particularly suspect.

White responses

Gambit Declined: 4.d3
White can decline the gambit and wait to capture the f-pawn. 4...Bc5 transposes to the Lucchini Gambit.

Gambit Accepted: 4.exf5
White still has a good game after the inferior 4.exf5, but the position is less clear. Black usually plays 4...e4, which White may meet by 5.Nd4 Nf6 (5...Nxd4 leads to trouble after 6.Qh5+) 6.Nxc6.

4.d4!

White gets a clear advantage with 4.d4!:
 4...fxe4 5.Nxe5 d5 6.Bb5 Ne7 7.0-0 a6 8.Bxc6+ bxc6 (8...Nxc6? 9.Qh5+) 9.f3 Bf5 10.Nc3 +/− (Bilguer Handbuch).
 4...d6 and now: 
 5.Ng5 Nh6 6.d5 Nb8 (6...Ne7 7.Nc3 f4 8.g3 Ng6 9.Bb5+ +/−; Maróczy) 7.Nc3 f4 8.h4 Bg4 9.f3 Bd7 10.g3 fxg3 11.f4 +/− (Sozin).
 5.dxe5 and now:
 5...fxe4 6.Qd5 Qe7 7.Bg5 Be6 8.Qxe4 +/− de Rivière–Anderssen, London 1862.
 5...dxe5 6.Qxd8+ Nxd8 (6...Kxd8 7.Bg5+ Nf6 8.Nc3 +/− Morphy–Worrall, London 1859) 7.Nxe5 fxe4 8.Bd2 Bd6 9.Bc3 +/− Löwenthal & Medley vs. Morphy & Mongredien, London 1857. 
 4...Nf6 5.dxe5 Nxe4 6.0-0 Bc5 7.Nc3 Nxc3 8.bxc3 h6 9.Nd4 g6 10.Nb3 +/− (Bilguer).

See also
 Latvian Gambit
 List of chess openings
 List of chess openings named after people

References

External links

Chess openings